This is a list of monuments in Chandragiri Municipality within Kathmandu District, Nepal as officially recognized by and available through the website of the Department of Archaeology, Nepal. Chandragiri is a historically rich area and Hindu temples are the main attraction of this municipality.

List of monuments

|}

See also 
 List of monuments in Kathmandu District
 List of monuments in Nepal

References

External links

Kathmandu District
Chandragiri